Podhale w ogniu is a Polish historical film about the Kostka-Napierski uprising. It was released in 1956.

References

External links
 

1956 films
Polish historical films
1950s Polish-language films
1950s historical films
Polish black-and-white films